Richard Barbieri (born 30 November 1957) is an English musician, composer and sound designer. Originally a member of new wave band Japan (and their brief 1989–1991 reincarnation as Rain Tree Crow), more recently he is known as the keyboard player in the progressive rock band Porcupine Tree, which he joined in 1993. Aside from the founder Steven Wilson, he is the longest tenured member of Porcupine Tree.

Biography

Japan (1974–1982)
Although initially perceived as a 'hyped' band, Japan went on to record five studio albums culminating in Tin Drum which stayed in the UK charts for a year. The painstaking approach to synthesiser programming by Richard Barbieri and David Sylvian and the original rhythmic patterns of Steve Jansen and Mick Karn produced a sound that remains original to this day. They were the one of the most successful chart bands in Europe and Asia in 1982 despite the increasingly experimental nature of their music. 

The band split up at the height of their popularity after a world tour in December 1982.

Guest appearances and Dolphin Brothers (1983–present)
After the break-up of Japan, Barbieri continued his association with David Sylvian, playing on the latter's early solo albums (and on the 1988 in Praise of Shamans tour). 

In 1984 he started a long musical association with another Japan colleague, Steve Jansen. This has produced six collaborative albums to date, under the name The Dolphin Brothers (Catch the Fall, 1987) and later as Jansen / Barbieri (including Worlds in a Small Room, 1985, Stories Across Borders, 1993, Other Worlds in a Small Room, 1996, and Stone to Flesh, 1997).

Rain Tree Crow (1989–1991)
In late 1989, the members of Japan (minus guitarist Rob Dean) reunited under the name Rain Tree Crow to make new recordings for Virgin. This resulted in a single eponymous album which extended the work of late Japan and the solo/collective work of all four members, featuring a variety of influences from pop to art rock, jazz, ambient and world music. Other contributors to the album included Bill Nelson. Rain Tree Crow charted in 1991 in the UK Top 25 and brought critical acclaim.

The group parted company shortly after recording the album, for which there was no supporting tour. However, the project was key to the reuniting of Jansen, Barbieri and Karn as a creative unit (sometimes referred to as "JBK").

With Alice (1989–1992)

Jansen and Barbieri played on many songs of two pivotal albums by the Italian singer Alice, i.e. on all of Il Sole Nella Pioggia and on two songs of Mezzogiorno Sulle Alpi, co-written by Barbieri. Other notable players on those albums were Peter Hammill, Gavin Harrison, Jakko Jakszyk, Danny Thompson and Jon Hassell.

No-Man (1992)
The next work by Jansen, Barbieri and Karn was as the rhythm section for British art-pop band No-Man, who recruited them for a 1992 UK tour and for recordings which later appeared on the Loveblows & Lovecries album and on the Painting Paradise and Sweetheart Raw EPs (one of these EP pieces, the 20-plus-minute Heaven Taste, later appeared on the album of the same name). This marked Barbieri's first work with Steven Wilson, with whom he would then go on to work in Porcupine Tree and Tim Bowness with whom he would later record the collaborative album "Flame".

Medium Productions (1993–2003)
In 1993, Barbieri formed the Medium Productions label in 1993 with Jansen and Karn. They commenced with the Jansen/Barbieri/Karn album Beginning to Melt (a collection of varied pieces including some trio work and other recordings featuring various permutations of the basic trio with other collaborators including David Torn and Robbie Aceto). Thirteen diverse albums were released during a ten-year period; Jansen and Barbieri's collaboration with DJ Takemura on the album Changing Hands being one of the highlights.

During this period Barbieri also made two other collaborative albums, one with his wife Suzanne J. Barbieri under the name Indigo Falls (1996), and one with Tim Bowness from the band No-Man titled Flame (1994).

Porcupine Tree (1993–2010, 2021–present)

In late 1993, Barbieri joined the progressive rock band Porcupine Tree (having previously played as a guest performer on the album Up the Downstair).  The band released eight studio albums to increasingly greater chart success, and toured in support of many of them.  Initially employing many aspects of psychedelic rock, they later transitioned to a more pop-oriented style before settling on progressive metal.  Their first major success was the album In Absentia, which enjoyed chart success around Europe with sales of over 120,000.  The following studio albums Deadwing and Fear of a Blank Planet met even greater success, charting highly worldwide, and picking up two Grammy Nominations. Increased radio airtime and favourable mainstream magazine reviews and interviews further increased their public exposure. The band transitioned somewhat away from metal with their 2010 album, The Incident, with leader Steven Wilson expressing a desire to enter a different genre. After years of speculation and diffusion of rumors from Wilson, the band announced its reunion in 2021.

With Steve Hogarth (2012)
Richard Barbieri collaborated with Steve Hogarth on the album Not The Weapon But The Hand, which was released by Kscope Records in 2012, but a proposed tour was cancelled for financial issues. Barbieri wrote the music and Hogarth provided the lyrics for the album.

Solo recordings (2004–present) 
Richard Barbieri has released four solo albums to date, Things Buried, 2004/5, Stranger Inside, 2008, Planets + Persona, 2017 and Under A Spell, 2021. Barbieri also released a series of 5 EP's on cd and vinyl under the title "Variants". These releases featured new compositions, improvisations, live performances and reworkings of older material.

Other activities
Aside from recording and touring, Barbieri has written articles on analogue synthesis for various publications and programs for music software and synthesizer manufacturers. He has guested many times with The Bays, an electronic improvisational group. Recent work with The Bays includes two Radio One sessions for the late John Peel and concerts at the Queen Elizabeth Hall and Brighton Dome. Richard and The Bays performed an improvised soundtrack to Run Lola Run in Darling Harbour, Sydney in 2009. He also undertakes occasional keyboards duties for the live outings of Marillion vocalist Steve Hogarth's fronted H-Band, appearing on the 2002 album Live Body, Live Spirit.

Discography

with Japan
1978 – Adolescent Sex (Hansa Records)
1978 – Obscure Alternatives (Hansa Records)
1979 – Quiet Life (Hansa Records)
1980 – Gentlemen Take Polaroids (Virgin records)
1981 – Tin Drum (Virgin Records)
1981 – Assemblage (compilation) (Hansa Records)
1983 – Oil on Canvas (live album) (Virgin Records)
1984 – Exorcising Ghosts (compilation) (Virgin Records)

with Rain Tree Crow
1991 – Rain Tree Crow (Virgin Records)

with Jansen/Barbieri
1985 – Worlds in a Small Room (Pan East (UK) / JVC Victor (Japan))
1991 – Stories Across Borders (Venture / Virgin)
1995 – Stone To Flesh (Medium Productions)
1996 – Other Worlds in a Small Room (Medium Productions)
2015 - Lumen (Kscope)

with Alice
1989 – Il sole nella pioggia
1992 – Mezzogiorno sulle Alpi

with Jansen/Barbieri/Karn
1994 – Beginning to Melt (Medium Productions)
1994 – Seed (Medium Productions)
1999 – ISM (Polydor / Medium)
2001 – Playing in a Room with People (Medium Productions)

with The Dolphin Brothers
1987 – Catch the Fall (Virgin Records)
1987 – Face To Face (Japanese T.V.C.M. 7" single) (Virgin Records)
(Also included on Virgin Japan CD release of
Catch The Fall)

with Jansen/Barbieri/Takemura
1997 – Changing Hands (Medium Productions)

with Indigo Falls
1996 – (Richard Barbieri/Suzanne Barbieri) (Medium Productions)

as Richard Barbieri/Tim Bowness
1994 – Flame (One Little Indian)

with Barbieri/Roedelius/Chianura
2001 – T'AI (Auditorium)

with Steve Hogarth/Richard Barbieri 
2012 – Not The Weapon But The Hand (K Scope)
2014 – Arc Light (Racket Records)

Richard Barbieri
2005 – Things Buried (Intact Records)
2008 – Stranger Inside (K-Scope/Snapper)
2017 - Planets + Persona (K Scope)
2017 - Variants.1 (K Scope)
2018 - Variants.2 (K Scope)
2018 - Variants.3 (K Scope)
2018 - Variants.4 (K Scope)
2018 - Variants.5 (K Scope)
2021 - Under a Spell (K Scope)
2021 - On High (Bandcamp/Orange Asylum Records)

with Porcupine Tree
1993 – Up the Downstair (Delerium Records)
1995 – The Sky Moves Sideways (Delerium Records)
1996 – Signify* (Delerium Records)
1997 – Coma Divine (Delerium Records)
1998 – Metanoia* (Delerium Records)
1999 – Stupid Dream* (Snapper Records)
2000 – Voyage 34: The Complete Trip* (Snapper Records)
2000 – Lightbulb Sun* (Snapper Records)
2001 – Recordings* (Snapper Records)
2002 – Stars Die: The Delerium Years 1991-1997 (Snapper Records)
2002 – In Absentia* (Lava / Warner)
2005 – Deadwing* (Lava / Warner)
2007 – Fear of a Blank Planet* (Roadrunner / Warner)
2007 – Nil Recurring* EP (Peaceville Records)
2009 – The Incident* (Roadrunner / Warner)
2022 - Closure/Continuation* (Music for Nations)
 Albums marked with an (*) include Barbieri compositions

As Producer 

 1982 Lustans Lakejer – En Plats I Solen (Stranded / Polar Records) (Sweden). In 2017, he joined them on a Swedish tour to perform the album in its entirety.
 1983 Akira Mitake – Out Of Reach (Epic/Sony Records) (Japan)
 1985 Die Werkpiloten – Faith (Dean/Ariola Records) (Germany)
 2003 Adom - Idiot Savant (Storm Records/Universal) (UK)
2009 - Endless (with Stefano Panunzi, Nicola Lori, Mick Karn, Gavin Harrison, Tim Bowness) (Forward Music Italy)

References

External links

Official Bandcamp site
Richard Barbieri - Exploring dualities

1957 births
Living people
British synth-pop new wave musicians
English keyboardists
English new wave musicians
English people of Italian descent
Italian British musicians
Japan (band) members
Porcupine Tree members
Progressive rock keyboardists